Yilibu (Manchu:  Ilibu; ; 1772 – 4 March 1843), also spelt Elepoo, was a Chinese official of the Qing dynasty. A Manchu of the Bordered Yellow Banner, he was Viceroy of Liangjiang from 1839 to 1840. In 1842, he assisted in negotiating the Treaty of Nanking, which ended the First Opium War between the United Kingdom and China.

He studied at Guozijian before working his way through the ranks of the then Imperial Government of China.

Notes

Further reading 

1772 births
1843 deaths
People of the First Opium War
Political office-holders in Jiangsu
Political office-holders in Shaanxi
Political office-holders in Shandong
Political office-holders in Zhejiang
Political office-holders in Yunnan
Qing dynasty diplomats
Qing dynasty politicians
Manchu politicians
Manchu Bordered Yellow Bannermen
Assistant Grand Secretaries
Viceroys of Yun-Gui
Viceroys of Liangjiang